Lambrequin is a French word for various applications of textiles. and in English may refer to:

An ornamental motif, especially associated with French Rouen faience of c. 1690 to 1750
Mantling in heraldry
In interior design (North America only), types of pelmet or valances, hangings around beds or windows